Chirripó Duchi River is a river located in Costa Rica.

References

Rivers of Costa Rica